This is a list of properties and districts in Clinch County, Georgia that are listed on the National Register of Historic Places (NRHP).

Current listings

|}

References

Clinch
Buildings and structures in Clinch County, Georgia